Lazers Never Die is the first extended play (EP) by Major Lazer, released on July 20, 2010 by Downtown Records. It includes the brand-new song "Sound of Siren" (featuring M.I.A. and Busy Signal), and four remixes of songs from the album Guns Don't Kill People... Lazers Do.

Track listing

References

2010 debut EPs
Albums produced by Major Lazer
Downtown Records EPs
Major Lazer albums